Friday Ekpo (born 13 August 1969) is a Nigerian footballer. He played in 19 matches for the Nigeria national football team from 1989 to 1993. He was also named in Nigeria's squad for the 1992 African Cup of Nations tournament.

References

External links
 

1969 births
Living people
Nigerian footballers
Nigeria international footballers
1992 African Cup of Nations players
Sportspeople from Lagos
Association football midfielders
Nigerian expatriate footballers
Leventis United F.C. players
Abiola Babes F.C. players
Heartland F.C. players
Expatriate footballers in Gabon